Phillip Duke (born 14 March 1960) is a former professional rugby league footballer who was selected to represent the New South Wales Blues in game III of the 1982 State of Origin series.

Duke, playing for the Moree Boomerangs, was the first of three players in the Country Rugby League who were selected to play Origin without having played in first-grade competition (then the New South Wales Rugby League). Although he scored the only New South Wales try in the game, Duke's performance was marred by a missed pass from Phil Sigsworth. The ball intended for Duke went astray and Queenslander Wally Lewis scooped it up, scored a try and won the game and the series for Queensland.

Duke later played two seasons with Western Suburbs Magpies, mainly as a winger.

References

 

Australian rugby league players
New South Wales Rugby League State of Origin players
Western Suburbs Magpies players
Living people
Rugby league wingers
1960 births